Presenting Chris Potter is the debut album led by jazz saxophonist Chris Potter which was recorded on December 29, 1992, and released in 1993 in the Netherlands by the Criss Cross Jazz label. It features Potter in a quintet with trumpeter John Swana, pianist Kevin Hays, bassist Christian McBride and drummer Lewis Nash.

Track listing
All compositions by Chris Potter except where noted
 "Juggernaut" − 8:09
 "Uneasy Dreams" − 8:26
 "The Tail That Wags the Dog" − 9:31
 "Reflections" (Thelonious Monk) − 7:12
 "So Far" − 10:49
 "Solar" (Miles Davis) − 6:21
 "Cindy's Story" − 8:43	
 "General Rodney" – 6:15

Personnel
Chris Potter - tenor saxophone, alto saxophone, soprano saxophone, alto flute, bass clarinet
John Swana – trumpet, flugelhorn
Kevin Hays − piano
Christian McBride − bass
Lewis Nash - drums

References

Chris Potter (jazz saxophonist) albums
1993 albums
Criss Cross Jazz albums